Roller derby is a women's sport in Mexico.

Leagues
 Morelia, Michoacán, Mexico – Roller Derby Morelia
 Ciudad de Mexico, Distrito Federal, Mexico – Liga Roller Derby DF

See also

 Roller derby

References

Roller derby
Mexico